Fluorescent D-amino acids (FDAAs) are D-amino acid derivatives whose side-chain terminal is covalently coupled with a fluorophore molecule. FDAAs incorporate into the bacterial peptidoglycan (PG) in live bacteria, resulting in strong peripheral and septal PG labeling without affecting cell growth. They are featured with their in-situ incorporation mechanisms which enable time-course tracking of new PG formation. To date, FDAAs have been employed for studying the cell wall synthesis in various bacterial species (both Gram-positives and Gram-negatives) through different techniques, such as microscopy, mass spectrometry, flow cytometry.

Structures and general properties 

FDAA consists of a D-amino acid and a fluorophore (coupled through the amino acid side chain.) The D-amino acid backbone is required for its incorporation into the bacterial peptidoglycan through the activity of DD-transpeptidases. Once being incorporated, one can use fluorescence-detection techniques to visualize the location of new PG formation as well as the growth rate.

D-alanine is the most well-studied D-amino acids for FDAA development because it is a naturally existing residue in bacterial peptidoglycan structures. On the other hand, various fluorophores have been employed for FDAA applications and each has its features. For example, coumarin-based FDAA (HADA) is small enough to penetrate the bacterial outer-membranes and thus is widely used for Gram-negative bacterial studies; while TAMRA-based FDAA (TADA) features its high brightness and photo/thermo-stability, which is suitable for super-resolution microscopy (strong excitation light is used).

Proposed FDAA incorporation mechanisms 

Peptidoglycan (PG) is a mesh-like structure containing polysaccharides cross-linked by peptide chains. Penicillin-binding proteins (DD-transpeptidases), in short PBPs, recognize the PG peptides and catalyze the cross-linking reactions. These enzymes are reported to have high specificity toward the chirality center of the amino acid backbone (the D-chiral center) but relatively low specificity toward the side-chain structure. Therefore, when FDAAs are present, they are taken by PBPs for the cross-linking reactions, resulting in their incorporation into the PG peptide chains. At proper concentration, e.g. 1-2 mM, FDAAs labeling does not affect PG synthesis and cell growth because only 1-2% of PG peptide chains are labeled with FDAA.

Applications 
Published studies utilizing FDAAs as tools include: 

 Visualizing bacterial cell wall structures.
 Studying bacterial cell wall growth.
 Monitoring bacterial cell wall turnover.
 Quantifying bacterial cell wall growth activity.
 Assaying the anti-cell wall ability of antibiotics.
 Screening new anti-cell wall antibiotics.
 Tracking transpeptidase activity in vitro.

References

External links 
FDAA website

Amino acids